YinzCam is an American software company that builds mobile applications, IPTV platforms and augmented-reality experiences.  It specializes in creating applications for professional sports organizations. As of 2018, YinzCam's software had been downloaded over 55 million times and used by 170+ sports properties, including NFL clubs, NBA/WNBA teams, AFL clubs (Australia), La Liga clubs (Spain), as well as in the La Liga official league app and the NBA's G League app and the NBA2k app. The applications generally offer real-time statistics, multimedia, streaming radio, social media. The live video technology offering instant replay, including NFL RedZone, is offered within NFL stadiums.

YinzCam was founded by Priya Narasimhan, a Professor of Electrical & Computer Engineering at Carnegie Mellon University in Pittsburgh. She is a fan of the Pittsburgh Penguins and the Pittsburgh Steelers. The company is a spin-off from the university. Narasimhan has incorporated YinzCam into her Sports Technology course at Carnegie Mellon University.

Official mobile apps for professional sports 
The first version of YinzCam's sports app was available in 2008 in limited portions of Civic Arena in 2008. That version of the software allowed users to view the game, replays and real-time game statistics. With the opening of Consol Energy Center in 2010, YinzCam was made available throughout the arena. In October 2010, YinzCam released an official application for the Pittsburgh Steelers. Partnerships with the New England Patriots and the San Francisco 49ers followed. By March 2012, YinzCam had added applications for 3 National Hockey League teams and more than 16 additional National Football League teams.

As of 2018, YinzCam is the developer of the official team apps for professional sports teams in the National Football League (NFL), the Australian Rules Football League (AFL), La Liga (Spain), the National Hockey League (NHL), the National Basketball Association (NBA), the Women's National Basketball Association (WNBA), Major League Soccer (MLS), as well as for teams in the Canadian Football League (CFL).  YinzCam is also the developer of the official league apps for La Liga, National Rugby League (Australia), NBA G League, and the AFL Women's League (Australia). YinzCam also developed official venue apps for the Gillette Stadium, the Barclays Center, the United Center, CenturyLink Field, and other stadiums.

Augmented reality 
YinzCam has also worked with professional sports teams to launch unique augmented-reality (AR) experiences, including a virtual pop-a-shot interactive game for basketball fans of the Cleveland Cavaliers and the Toronto Raptors. Fans could play against each other on the video board inside these basketball arenas and also earn badges and other achievements for being the top scorer. The Hawthorn Hawks (AFL) also launched an interactive version of this game for footy fans, allowing them to compete against other to score goals. Other AR sports experiences developed by YinzCam include an interactive Hall of Fame for Pittsburgh Steelers fans at Heinz Field.

iBurgh 
In July 2009, Pittsburgh City Councilman Bill Peduto, with the support of Pittsburgh Mayor Luke Ravenstahl, announced their intention for the city of Pittsburgh to become the most tech-friendly city in the United States. A number of Pittsburgh technology firms and personalities were present at the announcement, including Priya Narasimhan. By August 2009, YinzCam had produced iBurgh, an iPhone application to allow citizens to report complaints to the city's departments via smartphone. The app sends complaints, coupled with photos and Global Positioning System data to city departments. It was the first iPhone application to permit such complaints to municipal authorities.

In February 2010, YinzCam developed a follow-up program, CityZenMobile, to allow crowd-sourcing of road conditions. It was released amid the February 9–10, 2010 North American blizzard that left much of Pittsburgh impassable.

Notes

References 

Mobile software
Yinz
Companies based in Pittsburgh